Antonio Tapia Flores (born 13 November 1959) is a Spanish football manager.

Career
Born in Baena, Córdoba, Tapia had an unassuming career as a footballer, only representing Atlético Malagueño and amateurs UD Fuengirola. Still not in his 30s, he began a coaching career with another club in Andalusia, CD Mijas, continuing in the area (and the regional leagues) the following years, with Fuengirola and CD Los Boliches.

In 1994, Tapia joined Málaga CF's coaching staff as assistant, staying there for two years before moving in the same capacity to neighbouring Cádiz CF. He had his first spell as head manager with Polideportivo Ejido – still in Andalusia – in 1997, helping the side promote to Segunda División in 2001, although he would be sacked 11 matches into the following campaign due to bad results.

Tapia returned to Málaga's reserves in 2002, attaining another second division promotion. After Gregorio Manzano's dismissal midway through the 2004–05 season, he took the reins of the first team – in La Liga– being sacked in the same period of the following year and replaced by director of football Manolo Hierro, in an eventual relegation.

For the following two years, Tapia had spells in the second level and his native region, with Ejido and soon-to-be defunct Granada 74 CF, with relegation in the latter. He then returned to the top flight and Málaga – freshly promoted– and almost led the team to qualification to the UEFA Europa League, after finishing eighth.

After refusing a new deal in order to listen to other offers, Tapia would eventually leave his place to Juan Ramón López Muñiz (who returned from Racing de Santander after just one year), signing with Real Betis of division two. After a series of bad results, the last a 1–0 loss at Levante UD, he was sacked on 24 January 2010, only being in charge for six months.

Exactly one year after his dismissal, Tapia was appointed at CD Tenerife, becoming the Canary Islands side's third manager in the second division season. In late March, he too was relieved of his duties.

Tapia returned to Málaga on 21 August 2012, joining the club's football directory as a sporting adviser.

References

External links

1959 births
Living people
Sportspeople from the Province of Córdoba (Spain)
Spanish footballers
Footballers from Andalusia
Association footballers not categorized by position
Atlético Malagueño players
UD Fuengirola players
Spanish football managers
La Liga managers
Segunda División managers
Segunda División B managers
CD Los Boliches managers
Polideportivo Ejido managers
Málaga CF managers
Real Betis managers
CD Tenerife managers